Inindo: Way of the Ninja (伊忍道　打倒信長 or Inindou Datou Nobunaga, スーパー伊忍道　打倒信長 or Super Inindou Datou Nobunaga in its Super Famicom version) is a role-playing video game developed and published by Koei. Originally released for the PC8801SR, PC9801, MSX2 home computer and X68000, it was remade for the Super NES, which was also released in North America. The game is a fictional account of Japan's warring states period.

Plot 
Set in 1582, the player assumes the role of an Iga ninja whose village has been destroyed by the conquest of the demonic warlord Oda Nobunaga. The ninja must travel across feudal Japan, enlisting the aid of numerous ninja, sages, hermits, ronin, samurai, wizards and other companions, in order to avenge his clan.

The game is a fictitious account of the end of Oda Nobunaga's campaign to conquer and unify all of Japan. The beginning of the game references the rebellion of Akechi Mitsuhide at Honnō-ji Temple, where the historical Nobunaga died by committing seppuku. The time of the game over point (the year 1601) would be just prior to the birth of the Tokugawa shogunate under Tokugawa Ieyasu.

Gameplay 
The actual game begins in the year 1582. If the player does not kill Nobunaga by the end of year 1601, the game is over.

Several hazardous dungeons stand in the path of victory, as well as a selection of optional dungeons which can be played in any order the player chooses. There are 18 dungeons overall. Encounters with monsters and outlaws occur randomly in dungeons and in the game's world map, during which the player characters and NPCs can move around the battlefield in turn-based fashion to attack, cast magic spells and use items.

To complete the game, the player must recruit NPCs in order to successfully survive dungeons and large scale battles. In order to recruit other characters, the player must build up a certain degree of trust by talking with them at Tea Houses and Inns. Most of the NPCs can be recruited: characters of rival clans are not likely to join the player.

There are strategy and war simulation elements to game as well. By gaining the trust of a Japanese feudal lord (by spying or committing acts of sabotage on competing daimyo), the player can join in the battle for the provinces that characterized the era. The outcome of these battles changes the lords' possession of individual provinces, which can alter the outcome of the game and aid or hinder the player's progress.  Neighboring provinces to Nobunaga's must be conquered in order to advance to the final section of the game.

In the middle of the stories, the player follows either the "normal" path or the "magician" path, which is randomly selected after completing the first dungeon quest. Each path leads to different enemies during random encounters. For example, the "magician" path causes Western mythological monsters such as Hellhound or Marchosias to appear.

Due to the smaller resolution of the SNES, character names were shortened:

Windows version 
The Chinese version was ported to MS-DOS in 1993, playable in English OS. In 2003, the PC-9801 version of the game was ported to Windows 98, as part of Koei 25th Anniversary Pack Vol.1; standalone version was published in 2005. The Windows version runs the PC-9801 game in emulator; when saving, the emulator emulates drive switching operation. The port requires the use of mouse and the third scenario is inaccessible because of running in emulated environment.

Reception
GamePro review called Inindo "an impressive mix of adventure, fantasy, and epic military strategy", "a good RPG, featuring myth, magic, mayhem, and history" and "a great fantasy".

See also 
 Shinobido: Way of the Ninja

References

External links 
 
  Koei game info page
  Koei game info page (compilation)

1991 video games
DOS games
Fantasy video games
FM Towns games
Japanese role-playing video games
Koei games
MSX2 games
NEC PC-8801 games
NEC PC-9801 games
Video games about ninja
Sengoku video games
X68000 games
Super Nintendo Entertainment System games
Video games developed in Japan
Windows games
Cultural depictions of Oda Nobunaga